The 2000 Skate Israel was the 6th edition of a senior-level international figure skating competition held in Metulla, Israel. It was held at the Canada Centre. Skaters competed in the disciplines of men's singles, ladies' singles, and ice dancing.

Results

Men

Ladies

Ice dancing

External links
 results
 Skate Israel at the Israel Ice Skating Federation

Skate Israel
Israel Skate 2000
Skate Israel 2000